Marina Gilardoni (born 4 March 1987) is a Swiss skeleton racer and former bobsleigh brakewoman. After starting her sporting career in heptathlon at the club level, Gilardoni began racing bobsleigh in 2007 and earned a place on the Swiss national team. She won gold medals at the Junior World Championships in 2008 behind driver Fabienne Meyer and in 2010 with Sabina Hafner driving. After the 2009–10 season, she switched from bobsleigh to skeleton. In 2018, Gilardoni was selected to represent Switzerland in the Winter Olympics in Pyeongchang after the Dutch Olympic Committee refused one of their two entries and it was reallocated to Switzerland.

Notable results
Gilardoni's only podium finishes in bobsleigh were the two Junior World Championship wins. After switching to skeleton, she spent the 2010–11 season on the Europe Cup circuit but was quickly promoted to the Swiss World Cup squad for 2011–12, with the goal of maintaining the Swiss athlete quota in the World Cup. At her first World Cup race (Igls 2011), Gilardoni finished 14th. She competed in the 2014 Winter Olympics in Sochi, finishing 18th. Gilardoni's most successful season was 2015–16, when she earned four podiums (silver at Lake Placid and bronzes at Königssee and St. Moritz) on the way to an overall season ranking of fifth. Since then, her performance has been hampered by a nagging back injury, Gilardoni won the Swiss national championship at St. Moritz in December 2017, by six seconds over Alena Huber.

References

External links

1987 births
Skeleton racers at the 2014 Winter Olympics
Skeleton racers at the 2018 Winter Olympics
Living people
Olympic skeleton racers of Switzerland
Swiss female skeleton racers
20th-century Swiss women
21st-century Swiss women